Adam Stephens may refer to:

A character on Bewitched
A common misspelling of Adam Stephen, American Revolutionary War general from Virginia
Adam Stephens, musician in Two Gallants (band)

See also
Adam Stevens (disambiguation)